Václav Pšenička (October 26, 1906 in Prague – April 25, 1961) was a Czech weightlifter who competed for Czechoslovakia in the 1928 Summer Olympics,  in the 1932 Summer Olympics, and in the 1936 Summer Olympics.

He died in Prague. He was the father of Václav Pšenička, Jr.

In 1928 he finished fourth in the light-heavyweight class.

Four years later he won the silver medal in the heavyweight class at the 1932 Games.

At the 1936 Olympics he won his second silver medal in the heavyweight class.

External links
profile

1906 births
1961 deaths
Czech male weightlifters
Czechoslovak male weightlifters
Olympic weightlifters of Czechoslovakia
Weightlifters at the 1928 Summer Olympics
Weightlifters at the 1932 Summer Olympics
Weightlifters at the 1936 Summer Olympics
Olympic silver medalists for Czechoslovakia
World record setters in weightlifting
Olympic medalists in weightlifting
Medalists at the 1936 Summer Olympics
Medalists at the 1932 Summer Olympics
Sportspeople from Prague